Hierapolis or Hieropolis (Greek for sacred/Holy city) may refer to these Ancient cities in different Roman provinces of the Hellenistic world, and several former (now titular) (arch)bishoprics having see in such city :

in modern Turkey
 Hierapolis, in Phrygia Pacatiana Secunda, near modern Pamukkale, south-western Turkey.
 Hierapolis in Phrygia remains a Latin Catholic Metropolitan titular archbishopric
 Hierapolis ad Pyramum or Castabala, in Cilicia Secunda, near modern Adana, south-east Turkey
 a Latin Catholic titular bishopric, but under the name Castabala
 Hierapolis in Isauria,
 a Latin Catholic Titular bishopric with see in the above city
 Hierapolis of the Phrygian Pentapolis, modern Koçhisar, Sandıklı, near Afyonkarahisar, central Turkey
 Hieropolis Comana, in Cappadocia (central Turkey)

in modern Syria
 Hierapolis Euphratensis or Hierapolis Bambyce, in Roman Syria Euphratensis Prima, modern Manbij, north-central Syria
 as Hierapolis in Syria, the above city is the nominal see of three Catholic successor titular sees :
 the Latin Catholic Metropolitan titular archbishopric of Hierapolis of the Romans
 the Melkite Catholic Titular Archbishopric of Hierapolis of the Melkites
 the Syrian Titular Bishopric of Hierapolis of the Syrians

See also 
 Hierakonpolis, a Hellenistic city of Upper Egypt